Hiromi Ōta (太田 裕美  Ōta Hiromi, born on January 20, 1955, in Kasukabe, Saitama Saitama Prefecture, Japan) is a Japanese female singer. She is a popular singer who is considered an idol in Japan during the 1970s, and is thought to be representative of that era. She also collaborated with the composer-musician Ayuo and the Japanese koto player Kazue Sawai singing a unique blend of New Age, Classical and traditional Eastern music. Her collaborations with Ayuo were also released in the US on the CD "Red Moon" on Tzadik label.

She debuted in 1974. In 1975, she released "木綿のハンカチーフ" Momen no handkerchief, which became her trademark song.

She got married in 1985. Her real name became Hiromi Fukuoka.(福岡弘美)

Recently, she often holds joint concerts with Shozo Ise and Masumi Ōno.

References

External links 
 official website of Hiromi Ota (Japanese only)

Japanese women singers
1955 births
Living people
Musicians from Saitama Prefecture